Totino's and Jeno's are brands of frozen pizza products owned by General Mills.

History
Rose Totino and her husband, Jim, founded a take-out pizzeria in Minneapolis, Minnesota, in 1951. They later expanded it to a full-service restaurant, which  closed in 2011. They also founded a frozen-pizza manufacturing company. The Totinos eventually sold their frozen pizza business to the Pillsbury Company, where Rose Totino was named as vice-president. Totino’s brand was acquired by General Mills with its purchase of Pillsbury.

Separately, Jeno Paulucci developed a series of food businesses starting in the late 1940s, including the Chun King line of Chinese foods. After selling Chun King in 1966, he founded Jeno’s Inc. in 1968, where he developed Pizza Rolls, a type of egg roll filled with pizza ingredients. The first pizza roll flavor was cheese. In 1985, Paulucci sold his Jeno's Pizza Rolls brand to Pillsbury for $135 million.

The Jeno's line of pizza rolls was rebranded as Totino's in 1993.

Advertising
In 2019, it was announced that the company would partner with Activision and the Call of Duty franchise for in-game unlocks through purchases of Totino's products.

Product lines
 Totino's Big Party Pizza: Cheese, Pepperoni
 Totino's Party Pizza: Canadian style bacon, Cheese, Classic pepperoni, Triple Pepperoni, Combination, Hamburger, Pepperoni, Pepperoni trio, Sausage, Supreme, Three cheese, Three meat
 Totino's Family Size Pizza: Pepperoni, Cheese, Combination, Sausage
 Totino's Pizza Rolls snacks: Cheese, Cheesy taco, Combination, Pepperoni, Pepperoni trio, Sausage, Supreme, Triple cheese, Triple meat, Nacho Cheese, Buffalo Chicken, Spicy Taco, Bacon & Pepperoni, Macaroni and Cheese & Bacon, cheeseburger.
 Totino's Pizza Stuffers: Pepperoni, Cheese, Combination
 Totino's Pizza Chips: Pepperoni
 Jeno's Crisp 'N Tasty Pizza: Pepperoni, Cheese, Combination, Supreme (All Jeno's Crisp 'N Tasty Pizza discontinued May 2018)

Health and nutrition issues
On November 1, 2007, Totino's and Jeno's brand pizza were recalled for E. coli contamination.

Totino's products contain cheese substitutes made with hydrogenated oil. Totino's products have been criticized for their high amount of trans fat and sodium. In 2011, Consumer Reports rated Totino's as "only fair for nutrition" because of "high total fat and trans fat and low fiber."
 By at least October 2013, packaging on Totino's brand pizza now indicates 0 trans fat per serving.

See also
 List of frozen food brands

References

External links 
 Totinos history via General Mills
 General Mills Totino's and Jeno's page

2011 disestablishments in Minnesota

Defunct restaurants in the United States
Frozen pizza brands
General Mills brands
Pizzerias in the United States
Restaurants established in 1951
Products introduced in the 20th century
Frozen food brands
1951 establishments in Minnesota